Mangifera altissima (commonly known as pahutan, paho, or pajo), is a species of mango native to the Philippines and surrounding regions in Indonesia, Malaysia, Papua New Guinea and the Solomon Islands. It is not grown commercially but is harvested from the wild in the Philippines. It has small fruits that are pale yellow when ripe and are very sweet, though much more fibrous than commercially cultivated Mangifera indica species like Carabao mangoes. It is threatened by habitat loss.

In the Philippines, pahutan mangoes are eaten ripe as is, or eaten with rock salt or used in salads when unripe.

See also
Mangifera caesia (mangga wani)

References

altissima
Trees of Malesia
Trees of Papuasia
Vulnerable plants
Taxonomy articles created by Polbot
Taxa named by Francisco Manuel Blanco